Disruptive coloration (also known as disruptive camouflage or disruptive patterning) is a form of camouflage that works by breaking up the outlines of an animal, soldier or military vehicle with a strongly contrasting pattern. It is often combined with other methods of crypsis including background colour matching and countershading; special cases are coincident disruptive coloration and the disruptive eye mask seen in some fishes, amphibians, and reptiles. It appears paradoxical as a way of not being seen, since disruption of outlines depends on high contrast, so the patches of colour are themselves conspicuous.

The importance of high-contrast patterns for successful disruption was predicted in general terms by the artist Abbott Thayer in 1909 and explicitly by the zoologist Hugh Cott in 1940. Later experimental research has started to confirm these predictions. Disruptive patterns work best when all their components match the background.

While background matching works best for a single background, disruptive coloration is a more effective strategy when an animal or a military vehicle may have a variety of backgrounds.

Conversely, poisonous or distasteful animals that advertise their presence with warning coloration (aposematism) use patterns that emphasize rather than disrupt their outlines. For example, skunks, salamanders and monarch butterflies all have high-contrast patterns that display their outlines.

Early research

The artist Abbott Handerson Thayer in his 1909 book Concealing-Coloration in the Animal Kingdom argued that animals were concealed by a combination of countershading and "ruptive" marks, which together "obliterated" their self-shadowing and their shape. Thayer explained that:

Hugh Cott's 1940 book Adaptive Coloration in Animals introduced ideas such as "maximum disruptive contrast". This uses streaks of boldly contrasting colour, which paradoxically make animals or military vehicles less visible by breaking up their outlines. He explains that in ideal conditions, background colour matching together with countershading would "suffice to render an animal absolutely invisible against a plain background", but at once adds that conditions are hardly ever ideal, as they are constantly changing, as is the light. Therefore, Cott argues, camouflage has to break up the perceived continuous surfaces of an object and its outlines. In his own words, "for effective concealment, it is essential that the tell-tale appearance of form should be destroyed." He draws an analogy with a pickpocket who carefully distracts your attention, arguing that:

Further, Cott criticises unscientific attempts at camouflage, early in the Second World War, for not understanding the principles involved:

The pioneering work of Thayer and Cott is endorsed in the 2006 review of disruptive coloration by Martin Stevens and colleagues, which notes that they proposed a "different form of camouflage" from the traditional "strategy of background matching" proposed by authors such as Alfred Russel Wallace (Darwinism, 1889), Edward Bagnall Poulton (The Colours of Animals, 1890) and Frank Evers Beddard (Animal Coloration, 1895); Stevens observes that background matching on its own would always fail because of "discontinuities between the boundary of the animal and the background".

In animals

Disruptive patterns use strongly contrasting markings such as spots or stripes to break up the outlines of an animal or military vehicle. Some predators, like the leopard, and some potential prey like the Egyptian nightjar, use disruptive patterns. Disruptive patterns are defined by A. Barbosa and colleagues as "characterized by high-contrast light and dark patches, in a nonrepetitive configuration, that also provide camouflage by disrupting the recognizable shape or orientation of the animal", as in the cuttlefish.

The strategy appears paradoxical and counter-intuitive as a method of camouflage, since disrupting outlines depends on using patches of colour which contrast strongly with each other, so the patches are themselves conspicuous. While background matching works best for a single background, disruptive coloration is a more effective strategy when an animal or a military vehicle may have a variety of backgrounds.

Martin Stevens and colleagues in 2006 made what they believed was the first experimental test that "disruptive coloration is effective even when some colour patches do not match the background and have a high contrast with both the background and adjacent pattern elements (disruptive contrast)". They used "moth-like targets", some matching the lightness of the background oak tree bark, other mismatching it, each with a dead mealworm. If the mealworm was removed it was assumed a bird predator had taken it: this could be distinguished from visits by other predators. They found that disruptive coloration provided the best protection from bird predators when the pattern was matched to background luminance, but even when elements in a pattern did not match, disruptive patterns were still better at reducing predation than either non-disruptive patterns or plain (unpatterned) control targets.

Disruptive patterns can also conceal specific features. Animals such as fish, birds, frogs and snakes can readily be detected by their eyes, which are necessarily round and dark. Many species conceal the eye with a disruptive eye mask, sometimes contrasting with a stripe above the eye, making it seem just part of a dark area of background. Cott called this a special case of a "coincident disruptive pattern".

Another camouflage mechanism, distractive markings, also involves conspicuous marks and has for a century since Thayer's initial description been conflated with it, but the two require different kinds of marking. For distraction, the markings should be small and should avoid the prey's outline so as to take attention away from it, whereas disruptive markings should contact the outline so as to break it up.

The opposite case: aposematism

Many poisonous or distasteful animals that advertise their presence with warning coloration (aposematism) use patterns that emphasize rather than disrupt their outlines. For example, skunks, salamanders and monarch butterflies all have high contrast patterns that display their outlines. These advertising patterns exploit the opposite principle to disruptive coloration, for what is in effect the exactly opposite effect: to make the animal as conspicuous as possible. Some Lepidoptera, including the wood tiger moth, are aposematic and disruptively coloured; against a green, vegetative background their bright aposematic coloration stands out, but on the ground their wings camouflage them among dead leaves and dirt.

A disputed case: the giraffe

The presence of bold markings does not in itself prove that an animal relies on camouflage. According to Mitchell, adult giraffes are "inescapably conspicuous", making the conclusion that their patterns are for camouflage appear counterintuitive: but when standing among trees and bushes, their camouflage is effective at even a few metres' distance.

Further, young giraffes are much more vulnerable to predation than adults: between 60% and 75% of calves die within a year. Mothers hide their calves, which spend much of the time lying down in cover. Since the presence of a mother does not affect survival, Mitchell suggests that young giraffes must be extremely well camouflaged. This is supported by the fact that coat markings are strongly inherited. Conversely, far from hiding, adult giraffes move about to gain the best view of an approaching predator, relying on their size and ability to defend themselves even from lions.

Other ways of hiding outlines

The outlines of an animal's body can be made hard to see by other methods, such as by using a highly irregular outline. For example, the comma butterfly, Polygonia c-album, is highly cryptic when its wings are closed, with cryptic colours, disruptive pattern, and irregular outer margins to the wings.

In plants

The possibility of protective coloration in plants has been little studied. T. J. Givnish and Simcha Lev-Yadun have proposed that leaf variegation with white spots may serve as camouflage in forest understory plants, where there is a dappled background. Lev-Yadun has also suggested, however, that similar markings serve as conspicuous warning coloration in well-defended thorny plants of open habitats, where the background is uniformly bright. Givnish found a correlation of leaf mottling with closed habitats. Disruptive camouflage would have a clear evolutionary advantage in plants: they would tend to escape from being eaten by herbivores; and the hypothesis is testable.

Military usage

Disruptive coloration is common in military usage, for military vehicles, for firing positions and other installations, and for individual soldiers, where uniforms, equipment such as helmets, and face paint may be used to break up outlines and features. Disruptive coloration, however, does not always achieve crypsis on its own, as an animal or a military target may be given away by other factors including shape, shine, and shadow.

Many military camouflage patterns since the 1940s have been disruptively coloured, and with the issue of US Woodland pattern to United States armed forces from 1981, disruptive pattern became a dominant feature of military uniforms. From 1969, Disruptive Pattern Material (DPM) began to replace plain material for uniforms in the British Armed Forces and was later used by many other armies.

Challenges

Three major challenges face the design of disruptively patterned uniforms. Firstly, units frequently move from one terrain to another, where the background colours and contrasts may differ greatly. A uniform designed for woodland will be too strongly contrasting for desert use, and too green for urban use. Therefore, no single camouflage pattern is effective in all terrains. The American UCP of 2004 attempted to suit all environments but was withdrawn after a few years of service. Terrain specific patterns like "Berlin camouflage", which was applied to British vehicles operating in Berlin during the Cold War, have sometimes been developed but are ineffective in other terrains. Secondly, the effectiveness of any pattern in disrupting a soldier's outlines varies with lighting, depending on the weather and the height of the sun in the sky. And thirdly, any given patch of printed colour varies in apparent size with distance from the enemy observing the pattern. A pattern printed with small patches of colour blends into a single perceived mass at a certain range, defeating the disruptive effect. Conversely, a pattern printed with large patches of colour appears conspicuous at shorter ranges. This problem has been solved with pixellated shapes, often designed digitally, that provide a fractal-like range of patch sizes, enabling them to be effectively disruptive both at close range and at a distance. The first genuinely digital camouflage pattern was the Canadian CADPAT, soon followed by the American MARPAT. A pixellated appearance is not essential for this effect, though it is simpler to design and to print.

Examples

References

Sources

 
 

Camouflage
Military camouflage